Neve Gordon (born 1965) is an Israeli professor and academic. He is a professor of international law and human rights at Queen Mary University of London and writes on issues relating to the Israeli–Palestinian conflict and human rights. He used to teach at Ben-Gurion University of the Negev. A member of Academia for Equality, an organization working to promote democratization, equality and access to higher education for all communities living in Israel.

Early life
A third-generation Israeli, Gordon completed his military service in an IDF Paratrooper unit, suffering severe injuries in action at Rosh Hanikra which left him with a disability. During the first Intifada, he served as director of Physicians for Human Rights, Israel. He is an active member in Ta'ayush, Arab-Jewish Partnership. He identifies himself as a member of the Israeli peace camp, has described Israel as an "apartheid state," and supports the Boycott, Divestment and Sanctions against Israel movement.

Academic career
Gordon received his doctorate at the University of Notre Dame in 1999. In the same year he started his academic career in the Dept. of Politics and Government at the Ben-Gurion University. He became a Department chairperson in 2008-2010 and was promoted to Full Professor in 2015. During these years Gordon has been a visiting scholar at University of California, Berkeley, University of Michigan, Brown University, the Institute for Advanced Study at Princeton, and at SOAS, University of London. Gordon has participated in the 'Humanitarian Action in Catastrophe' group at the Van Leer Jerusalem Institute.

In 2009, after Gordon wrote an article for the Los Angeles Times supporting a boycott of Israel and calling Israel an apartheid state, Rivka Carmi, the president of Ben-Gurion University, declared that “academics who feel that way about their country are invited to look for different professional and personal accommodation,” and right-wing organisations demanded his department to be closed. In 2012, education minister Gideon Sa’ar called for Gordon’s dismissal. Gordon and his partner received threats to their lives and decided to move to London with their two sons, and Gordon became a professor at Queen Mary University of London.

Publications
Gordon's articles have been published in LA Times, The Washington Post, The Nation, The Guardian, Ha'aretz, The Jerusalem Post, The Chicago Tribune, Boston Globe, London Review of Books, Al Jazeera, In These Times, The National Catholic Reporter, The Chronicle of Higher Education and CounterPunch.

Gordon was co-editor, together with Ruchama Marton, of Torture: Human Rights, Medical Ethics and the Case of Israel and editor of From the Margins of Globalization: Critical Perspectives on Human Rights. His book Israel's Occupation was published by the University of California Press in late 2008, and his co-authored books The Human Right to Dominate was published by Oxford University Press in 2015, and Human Shields: A History of People in the Line of Fire was also published by University of California in 2020.

Views

Israel–Palestine conflict and Israeli politics
Gordon describes himself as a supporter of the one-state solution and as a member of the Israeli peace camp.

Directly after the February 2009 Israeli election, Gordon stated that it would have "devastating effects". He also stated that the new Yisrael Beiteinu party possessed 'neo-fascist' tendencies. He concluded that the Obama administration should pressure the Likud-based government coalition economically and politically to adopt the two-state solution.

Support for economic and political boycotts of Israel
Gordon wrote in a Los Angeles Times editorial on August 20, 2009 that he had decided to support the Boycott, Divestment and Sanctions against Israel movement. He stated that Israel had become so right wing and 'an apartheid state' that he felt he had no choice but to support this course of action. This led to threats by some US donors to withhold funds from Ben-Gurion University, and to a heated debate within Israel over the rights of academics to freedom of expression.

The Ben-Gurion University management responded by denouncing Gordon's views. The President of the University, Professor Rivka Carmi, said, "We are appalled by Dr. Neve Gordon's irresponsible remarks, that morally deserve to be completely and utterly condemned. "We disapprove of Gordon's disastrous views and reject his cynical exploitation of the freedom of speech in Israel and the university." Israeli Education Minister Gideon Sa'ar called Gordon's article "repugnant and deplorable. Religious Affairs Minister Ya'akov Margi called on the university to immediately suspend Gordon from his job and to publicly condemn his article.

Gordon – Plaut court case
Aside from his vocal criticism of Israeli policies, Gordon was well known in a high-profile controversy involving Steven Plaut in which Gordon sued Plaut for libel. In May 2006, the Israeli magistrate court in Nazareth ruled in favour of Gordon, and ordered Plaut to pay Gordon 80,000 shekels in compensation plus 15,000 shekels in legal fees. Both sides appealed to the District Court in Nazareth and in February 2008, the court upheld a libel judgment relating to a publication in which Plaut called Gordon a "Judenrat Wannabe" but reduced the damages to 10,000 shekels (about $2,700) because the court reversed three out of four of the libel claims. The Supreme Court of Israel rejected Plaut's request to review the case.

Books
 Torture, Human Rights, Medical Ethics and the case of Israel, Zed Books, New York,  (1995; editor, with Ruchama Marton)
 From the Margins of Globalization: Critical Perspectives on Human Rights. Lexington Books, Lanham, MD,  (2004; editor)
 Israel's Occupation. University of California Press, Berkeley CA,  (2008)
 The Human Right to Dominate with Nicola Perugini, Oxford University Press,  (2015)
 Human Shields: A History of People in the Line of Fire with Nicola Perugini, University of California Press,  (2020)

References

External links
Gordon's personal page at Queen Mary University
Bio at The Nation
Znet Bio
Neve Gordon can't take criticism, An article by Alan Dershowitz
Anti-Israeli? You just don't like what I say, Gordon's response to Alan Dershowitz
Gordon's recent article in Al-Jazeera on Israeli Media after the fall of Mubarak

1965 births
Living people
Israeli political scientists
Academic staff of Ben-Gurion University of the Negev
Brown University faculty
University of California, Berkeley faculty
University of Michigan faculty
University of Notre Dame alumni
Jewish social scientists
The Nation (U.S. magazine) people
Los Angeles Times people